Cannabis in Kosovo is illegal for both medicinal or recreational purposes. Penalties are defined by Article 269 of the Kosovo Criminal Code, last revised in January 2019. For first-time offenders, possession of illicit substances leads to either a one-year sentence or, more likely, a financial penalty of €250-300. A 2014 survey of 5500 reported that 10% of Kosovans knew someone who had used cannabis and 12.6% reported having easy access to cannabis.

History
The Kingdom of Yugoslavia ratified the International Opium Convention on 4 September 1929. The first law to sanction drug abuse was the Criminal Code of the Kingdom of Serbs, Croats and Slovenes passed on 27 January 1929 and which entered into force on 1 January 1930, which sets a prison sentence of up to 6 months for "serving" narcotic drugs in the section "Crimes against Public Health".

Trafficking

Since the Kosovo War, organised crime in Kosovo has engaged in the trafficking of drugs including marijuana alongside heroin and cocaine. Kosovo acts as a transit hub for traffic between Afghanistan and Italy, and from Albania to the rest of Europe. From 2001 to 2007, a total of 286.89 kg of cannabis was seized by Kosovo Police. Cannabis is cultivated in Kosovo, for domestic use primarily. The cultivation of cannabis is spread in most parts of the country's territory.

References

Kosovo
Health in Kosovo
Politics of Kosovo
Kosovo